Wadda Ghalughara was the mass murder of unarmed Sikhs by the Afghan forces of the Durrani Empire during the years of Afghan influence in the Punjab region of the Indian subcontinent owing to the repeated incursions of Ahmad Shah Durrani in February 1762. It is distinguished from the Chhota Ghalughara (the Smaller Massacre). Mostly non-combatants were killed in the event, and an estimated that 10,000 to 20,000 Sikhs were killed on 5 February 1762.

The  was a dramatic and bloody massacre during the campaign of Afghanistan's (Durrani Empire) provincial government based at Lahore to wipe out the Sikhs, an offensive that had begun with the Mughals and lasted several decades.

Background

Persecution of the Sikhs (1746–1762) 
In the 18 years following the Chhota Ghalughara, Punjab was roiled with five invasions and had several years of rebellions and civil war. Under these unsettled circumstances, it was difficult for any authority to carry on a campaign of oppression against the Sikhs; instead the Sikhs were often sought and valued as useful allies in the various struggles for power.

In these times of relative calm, however, Shah Nawaz, the governor at Lahore in 1747 and his Afghan allies resumed their genocidal campaigns against the Sikhs. This period was characterised by the desecration of Sikh places of worship and the organised capture, torture and merciless execution of tens of thousands of Sikh men, women and children.

The Governorship of Mir Mannu 
Mir Mannu (Mu'in ul-Mulk) became governor of Lahore and the surrounding provinces in 1748 and, continued to hold that position for the next five years until 1753 through his exploits in battle against the Afghan army. His first act as governor was to take control of Ram Rauni, the Sikh fort at Amritsar, where 500 Sikhs had taken shelter. To take control of the fort and defeat the Sikhs, Mir sent word to Adina Beg, the commander of the army of Jalandhar. Both the armies of Lahore and Jalandhar eventually laid siege to the fort, and despite much resistance from the Sikhs, it eventually fell to them. Mir Mannu then stationed detachments of troops in all parts of Punjab with any Sikh inhabitants with orders to capture them and shave their heads and beards. His oppression was such that large numbers of Sikhs moved to relatively inaccessible mountains and forests. The governor ordered the apprehending of Sikhs who were sent in irons to Lahore. Hundreds were thus taken to Lahore and executed in the horse market before crowds of onlookers. According to the historian Nur Ahmed Chishti, Mir Mannu ordered the execution of more than 1,100 Sikhs at the horse market of Shahidganj during Eid.

Partly through the influence of his Hindu minister, Kaura Mall, who was sympathetic to the Sikhs, and partly because of the threat of another Afghan invasion, Mir Mannu made peace with the Sikhs the next year. They were granted a piece of land near Patti. This truce did not last long as in the next Afghan invasion the artillery of Lahore attacked the Sikhs of Dal Khalsa under Sukha Singh. The Sikh army left promptly after this attack, which led to the eventual defeat and fall of Lahore to Durrani. Kaura Mall was also eventually murdered by Adina Beg at the hands of a Pathan in the battle against the Afghans in 1752. Lahore was soon surrendered to the invader Ahmad Shah Durrani. The land given to the Sikhs was also seized back from them. 

In his new role as governor for the Afghans, Mir Mannu was able to resume his persecution of the Sikhs. Moreover, he had arranged for new artillery to be forged and a unit of 900 men assigned especially to the hunting down of the "infidels". In the words of an eyewitness: "Muin appointed most of the gunmen to the task of chastising the Sikhs. They ran after these wretches up to  a day and slew them wherever they stood up to oppose them. Anybody who brought a Sikh head received a reward of ten rupees per head."

According to that same account: "The Sikhs who were captured alive were sent to hell by being beaten with wooden mallets. At times, Adina Beg Khan sent 40 to 50 Sikh captives from the Doab. They were as a rule killed with the strokes of wooden hammers."

Mir Mannu explicitly ordered his troops to seize and torture the Sikh women and children. The women were seized from their homes and forced to grind grain in prison with the detainees forced to grind about 1.25 maunds of grain (46 kilograms of grain) to grind in a day. According to a Sikh account, "Many of the women were given merciless lashing, working all day exhausted from thirst and hunger, they plied their stone-mills and while they plied their stone-mills they sang their Guru's hymns. The Hindu or the Muslim, or in fact anyone who saw them and listened to their songs was utterly astonished. As their children, hungry and thirsty, wailed and writhed on the ground for a morsel, the helpless prisoners in the hands of the prisoners could do little except solace them with their affection until wearied from crying the hungry children would go to sleep."

Mir Mannu's cruel reign, however, did not stop the spread of Sikhism. According to a popular saying of that time "Mannu is our sickle, We the fodder for him to mow. The more he cuts, the more we grow." The continued harassment by Mir Mannu only helped strengthen the numbers and faith of the Sikhs.

Baba Deep Singh 

In 1756 Ahmad Shah Durrani started his fourth raid on India for plunder. He managed to successfully raid the city of Delhi and captured gold, jewellery and thousands of Hindu women as slaves. But on his way back his baggage train was repetitively ambushed and attacked by the Sikh forces, who liberated the slaves and returned the plunder. Durrani managed to escape and vowed to take revenge against the Sikhs. Because Durrani could not lay his hands on the elusive bands of Sikhs, he determined to attack their holy city Amritsar, the Harimandir Sahib was blown up, and the surrounding pool filled with the entrails of slaughtered cows.

As the leader of one of the Sikh divisions entrusted with the care of the temple, he felt responsible for the damage that had been done to it and announced his intention of rebuilding the Harmandir Sahib. He set out his forces Sikhs toward the Amritsar and along the way, many other Sikhs joined, eventually numbering about 5,000 when they reached the outskirts of Amritsar. In the nearby town of Tarn Taran Sahib they prepared themselves for martyrdom by sprinkling saffron on each other's turbans.

When word reached Lahore that a large body of Sikhs had arrived near Amritsar a Janam Khan mobilised an army of 20,000 soldiers. Two large forces were sent. Approaching Amritsar, Baba Deep Singh and his companions encountered them and a fierce battle ensued. The Sikh forces battled valiantly but the superior numbers of the enemies and continuous reinforcements led to their eventual defeat.

Wielding his double-edged sword, the 75-year-old Sikh sustained many wounds but managed to kill the general Janam Khan beheading him in the process. According to tradition, his head was severed but Baba Deep Singh still pressed on in his determination to reach the holy shrine, until he made the precincts of the Harmandir Sahib. It was Baba Deep Singh's headless body holding his head on his left hand and wielding his great sword in his right that had fought on until he redeemed his pledge to reach the holy temple.

The Massacre of 1762
The place was the home of Aqil, the head of the Nirinjania sect, a friend of the Afghans, and an inveterate enemy of the Sikhs.

Aqil sent messengers to Durrani pleading for his help against the Sikhs. The Afghan forces hurried to Jandiala, but by the time they arrived the siege had been lifted and the besiegers were gone.

The Sikh fighters had retreated with the view of taking their families to safety in the Haryana desert east of their location before returning to confront the invader. When the Afghan leader came to know of the whereabouts of the Sikhs he sent word ahead to his allies in Malerkotla and Sirhind to stop their advance.

In twilight Durrani and his allies surprised the Sikhs who numbered about 30,000 with most of them noncombatants. It was decided that the Sikh fighters would form a cordon around the slow-moving baggage train consisting of women, children and old men. Then they would then make their way to the desert in the south-west by the town of Barnala, where they expected their ally Alha Singh of Patiala to come to their rescue.

A secondhand account by the son and nephew of two eyewitnesses describes the Sikhs. "Fighting while moving and moving while fighting, they kept the baggage train marching, covering it as a hen covers its chicks under its wings." More than once, the troops of the invader broke the cordon and mercilessly butchered the women, children and elderly inside, but each time the Sikh warriors regrouped and managed to push back the attackers.

By early afternoon, the fighting cavalcade reached a large pond, the first they had come across since morning. Suddenly the bloodshed ceased as the two forces went to the water to quench their thirst and relax their tired limbs.

From that point on the two forces went their separate ways. The Afghan forces had inflicted great losses on the Sikh nation and had in turn many of them killed and wounded; they were exhausted having not had any rest in two days. The remainder of the Sikhs proceeded into the semi-desert toward Barnala. Ahmad Shah Durrani's army returned to the capital of Lahore with hundreds of Sikhs in chains. From the capital, Durrani returned to Amritsar and blew up the Harmandir Sahib which since 1757 the Sikhs had rebuilt. As a deliberate act of sacrilege, the pool around it was filled with cow carcasses. It was estimated that 10,000 to 20,000 Sikhs were killed on 5 February 1762.

Aftermath
After two months Sikh again assembled and defeated Afghans in Battle of Harnaulgarh

See also
 Chhota Ghallughara
 Jallianwala Bagh massacre
 Patharighat massacre
 List of massacres in India
 Battle of Kup

References

History of Sikhism
Religiously motivated violence in India
Massacres of Sikhs
1760s in the Durrani Empire
Persecution of Sikhs